Blacklodge is an industrial black metal band from France, founded in 1998 by Saint Vincent in Grenoble. The band's name is taken from a fictional place known as the Black Lodge in the David Lynch series Twin Peaks.

History

Early years and Login:Satan (1998–2005) 
The band was created in 1998 by Saint Vincent. The band's influences are Mysticum and Dodheimsgard, though Saint Vincent names the German band Traumatic Voyage as one of his main influences.

They played their first live gig in Grenoble as openers for Impaled Nazarene. In 2004 they toured with Aborym and Corpus Christii.

Solarkult (2005–2010) 
A new era started for the band with their cooperation with Tore Stjerna from the Necromorbus Studio, where they recorded their album Solarkult. With this opus they signed with the French underground label End All Life. In 2007, Silence left the band and was replaced by Narcotic before their European tour with the bands Horna and Vorkreist.

T/ME (2010–2012) 
A collaboration with the Austrian band Abigor resulted in a split album. T/ME, 3rd level Initiation : Chamber of Downfall was released by End All Life.

Machination (2012–present) 
The band signed with Season of Mist in 2012.

Members

Current line-up 
 Saint Vincent – vocals, guitar, machines (1998–present)
 AcidJess – bass (2002–present)
 Narcotic – guitar (2007–present)

Former members 
 Silence – guitar (1999–2007)
 Diam's – bass (1999–2002)

Discography

Studio albums

Demos 
 InnerCells (1999)
 Prince of Dark Cellars (1999)
 Login:Satan demo (2001)

Music videos 
 1999: "Prince of Dark Cellars" (directed by Marc Canlers)
 2010: "Vector G" (directed by Pierre Reynard)

References

External links 
 

Musical groups established in 1998
Season of Mist artists
French black metal musical groups
Organizations based in Grenoble
1998 establishments in France
Musical groups from Auvergne-Rhône-Alpes